The Gbi and Dorue language, also known as Gbee or Gbi and Dorue, is similar to the  Krahn language of the Niger–Congo language family. It is spoken in northern Liberia  which is a district within Nimba County. Its dialects include Gbi and Dorue. It has a lexical similarity of 78% with the Bassa language.

In 1991, Gbi was spoken by 18,600 people.

See also 
 Languages of Africa

References 

Kru languages
Languages of Liberia